Jean Söderberg (1890–1924) was a Swedish bandy player and footballer.

Söderberg was part of the Djurgården Swedish champions' team of 1912.

As footballer, Söderberg was part of the Djurgården Swedish champions' team of 1912. Söderberg made 14 Allsvenskan appearances for Djurgården and scored 2 goals.

Jean Söderberg's brother Sten Söderberg was a Swedish international and also played for Djurgårdens IF Bandy and Djurgårdens IF Fotboll, while his other brother Herman Söderberg represented Järva IS.

Honours

Club 
 Djurgårdens IF 
 Svenska Mästerskapet: 1912

References

Swedish bandy players
Djurgårdens IF Bandy players
Swedish footballers
Djurgårdens IF Fotboll players
Svenska Serien players